The seventy-seventh Minnesota Legislature first convened on January 8, 1991. The 67 members of the Minnesota Senate and the 134 members of the Minnesota House of Representatives were elected during the General Election of November 6, 1990.

Sessions 
The legislature met in a regular session from January 8, 1991, to May 20, 1991. A continuation of the regular session was held between January 6, 1992, and April 16, 1992. There were no special sessions of the seventy-seventh Legislature.

Party summary 
Resignations and new members are discussed in the "Membership changes" section, below.

Senate

House of Representatives

Leadership

Senate 
President of the Senate
Jerome M. Hughes (DFL-Maplewood)

Senate Majority Leader
Roger Moe (DFL-Erskine)

Senate Minority Leader
Duane Benson (IR-Lanesboro)

House of Representatives 
Speaker of the House
Until January 6, 1992 Robert Vanasek (DFL-New Prague)
After January 6, 1992 Dee Long (DFL-Minneapolis)

House Majority Leader
Until July 11, 1991 Dee Long (DFL-Minneapolis)
After July 11, 1991 Alan Welle (DFL-Willmar)

House Minority Leader
Terry Dempsey (IR-New Ulm)

Members

Senate

House of Representatives

Membership changes

Senate

House of Representatives

Notes

References 

 Minnesota Legislators Past & Present - Session Search Results (Session 77, Senate)
 Minnesota Legislators Past & Present - Session Search Results (Session 77, House)

77th
1990s in Minnesota
1991 in Minnesota
1992 in Minnesota
1991 U.S. legislative sessions
1992 U.S. legislative sessions